David Eugene Clark (April 28, 1936 – February 12, 2018) was an American athlete. He competed in the men's pole vault at the 1960 Summer Olympics.

Clark was born in Frisco, Texas, and grew up in Grand Prairie, Texas.  He graduated from Grand Prairie High School and North Texas State University.

Clark died at his home in Duncanville, Texas.

References

External links
 

1936 births
2018 deaths
Athletes (track and field) at the 1960 Summer Olympics
American male pole vaulters
Olympic track and field athletes of the United States
People from Frisco, Texas
Sportspeople from the Dallas–Fort Worth metroplex
Track and field athletes from Texas